Sir Oliver Luke (1574–c.1651) of Woodend, Cople and Hawnes, Bedfordshire was an English politician who sat in the House of Commons of England from 1614 to 1648.

Luke was born at Cople, Bedfordshire, the son of Sir Nicholas Luke and his wife Margaret St John. He was educated at King's College, Cambridge and entered the Middle Temple in 1592 to study law. He was knighted in 1603 and succeeded his father in 1613.

In 1614, Luke was elected Member of Parliament for Bedfordshire in the Addled Parliament. He was High Sheriff of Bedfordshire in 1617. He was elected for succeeding parliaments until King Charles dispensed with parliament in 1629. He remained a supporter of the parliamentary forces but was excluded under Pride's Purge in 1648. 
  
Luke probably died around the age of 76 after he was excluded from the Long Parliament.

He had married Elizabeth Knightley, daughter of Sir Valentine Knightley and Anne Unton on 17 August 1599. He remarried by 1616, Maud, the daughter of William Trenchard of ‘Cutheridge’, Wiltshire. He had at least 3 sons and a daughter. His son Samuel Luke was also an MP.

References

External links
 findagrave.com burial record

1574 births
1670 deaths
Alumni of King's College, Cambridge
Members of the Middle Temple
Roundheads
Knights Bachelor
High Sheriffs of Bedfordshire
English MPs 1614
English MPs 1621–1622
English MPs 1624–1625
English MPs 1625
English MPs 1626
English MPs 1628–1629
English MPs 1640 (April)
English MPs 1640–1648
People from Cople